Scandic Talk Hotel (previously the Rica Talk Hotel) is a skyscraper and hotel, located at the Stockholm International Fairs in Älvsjö, Stockholm Municipality, Sweden. It is 72 m tall and includes 19 floors and 248 rooms. Scandic acquired the hotel in 2014 when it purchased Rica Hotels

The building was constructed by Rosenbergs Arkitekter and it opened on 23 May 2006.

References and sources

External links 
 Pictures of Rica Talk Hotel in 2006

Skyscrapers in Sweden
Hotels in Stockholm
Hotels established in 2006
Skyscraper hotels
2006 establishments in Sweden
Hotel buildings completed in 2006